El Retiro (also known as Encierro and as Pinewood Estate) is a historic site in Lake Wales, Florida. It is located at 1151 Tower Blvd, Lake Wales, FL 33853. The 12,900 square foot house was designed by architect Charles R. Wait for the original owner, Charles Austin Buck. 

The design specified a "barrel-tile roof, thick walls, substantial carved doors and woodwork, and intricately detailed wrought iron ... and three large porches". The gardens were designed by William Lyman Phillips of the Olmsted Brothers firm. The work on the property was completed in 1929-1930. Buck owned the home until 1947. It was purchased by Nellie Lee Holt Bok in 1970 and renamed Pinewood Estate. A subsequent restoration of the gardens, to their original design, was completed by landscape architect Rudy Favretti. Since 1970, the estate has been part of Bok Tower Gardens, and is again known as El Retiro. Visitors to the adjacent Bok Tower Gardens may tour the home for an extra fee.    

On December 12, 1985, the 20 room home was added to the U.S. National Register of Historic Places.

References

External links

 Polk County listings at National Register of Historic Places
 Polk County listings at Florida's Office of Cultural and Historical Programs
Pinewood Estate History at Bok Tower Gardens

Buildings and structures in Lake Wales, Florida
National Register of Historic Places in Polk County, Florida